Borišov is a mountain in the Greater Fatra Range in Slovakia measuring 1,508.5 m (4,949.1 ft). Its summit is deforested, covered in grass. On the southern side there is one of the largest avalanche slopes in Slovakia. The Borišov National Nature Reserve protects a well-preserved primeval mountain forest on the northern side of the mountain.

In the saddle between Borišov and Ploská there is the year-round open Chata pod Borišovom (i.e. Chalet under Borišov).

References 

Veľká Fatra
Mountains of Slovakia